Motoo (written: 資生, 元夫, 幹郎, 幹雄, 基男 or 統男) is a masculine Japanese given name. Notable people with the name include:

, Japanese baseball player
, Japanese table tennis player
, Japanese general
, Japanese politician
, Japanese biologist
, Japanese music critic
, Japanese footballer

Japanese masculine given names